Field Marshal Sir George Howard KB, PC (17 June 1718 – 16 July 1796) was a British military officer and politician. After commanding the 3rd Regiment of Foot at the Battle of Fontenoy in May 1745 during the War of the Austrian Succession and after commanding that regiment again at the Battle of Falkirk Muir and the Battle of Culloden during the Jacobite Rebellion, he returned to the continent and fought at the Battle of Lauffeld. He went on to command a brigade at the Battle of Warburg during the Seven Years' War. He subsequently became the Governor of Minorca.

Military career
Born the son of Lieutenant General Thomas Howard and his wife Mary Howard (née Moreton, daughter of William Moreton, Bishop of Meath), Howard was educated at Westminster School and Christ Church, Oxford and was commissioned as a lieutenant in his father's regiment (later the 24th Regiment of Foot) in 1736. He was promoted to captain in 1737 and transferred to the 3rd Regiment of Foot in 1739. Promoted to lieutenant colonel on 2 April 1744, he commanded the 3rd Regiment of Foot at the Battle of Fontenoy in May 1745 during the War of the Austrian Succession.

Howard commanded the 3rd Regiment of Foot again, under the Duke of Cumberland, at the Battle of Falkirk Muir in January 1746 and the Battle of Culloden in April 1746 during the Jacobite Rebellion and was accused of treating the defeated highlanders unduly harshly. He then returned to the continent and fought at the Battle of Lauffeld in July 1747. He succeeded his father as colonel of the 3rd Regiment of Foot in August 1749. He went on to take part in the Raid on Rochefort in September 1757 and, having been promoted to major-general on 24 January 1758, he commanded a brigade, under the Marquess of Granby, at the Battle of Warburg in July 1760 during the Seven Years' War. He was promoted to lieutenant-general on 14 March 1761.

Howard became Member of Parliament (MP) for Lostwithiel in 1761 and, having been appointed a Knight Companion of the Bath in early 1763, he became colonel of the 7th (The Queen's Own) Regiment of Dragoons in August 1763. He acquired Stoke Place in Buckinghamshire for use as a country home in 1764.

Howard stood down from Parliament and became Governor of Minorca in 1766. After retiring as Governor of Minorca, he became governor of the Royal Hospital Chelsea in February 1768 and was elected as Member of Parliament for Stamford that same year.

Promoted to full general on 6 September 1777, Howard became colonel of the 1st (The King's) Dragoon Guards in April 1779. He was promoted to field marshal on 18 October 1793 and appointed to the honorary post of Governor of Jersey in July 1795. He died at his London home in Grosvenor Square on 16 July 1796 and was buried at Great Bookham in Surrey.

Family
On 16 February 1747–8, Howard married Lady Lucy Wentworth (sister of William Wentworth, Earl of Strafford), under licence from the Bishop of London, at the King Street Chapel in St James's, Westminster: they had one daughter Anne. After the death of his first wife, Howard married Elizabeth Beckford, the widow of Thomas Howard, 2nd Earl of Effingham; there were no children by the second marriage.

References

Sources

 

|-

|-

1718 births
1796 deaths
George
1st King's Dragoon Guards officers
7th Queen's Own Hussars officers
British field marshals
British Army personnel of the American Revolutionary War
Buffs (Royal East Kent Regiment) officers
Knights Companion of the Order of the Bath
Members of the Parliament of Great Britain for English constituencies
British Army personnel of the Jacobite rising of 1745
Members of the Parliament of Great Britain for constituencies in Cornwall
British MPs 1761–1768
British MPs 1768–1774
British MPs 1774–1780
British MPs 1780–1784
British MPs 1784–1790
British MPs 1790–1796
British MPs 1796–1800
Governors of Jersey